The 1933–34 season was Port Vale's 28th season of football in the English Football League, and their fourth successive season (27th overall) in the Second Division. Finishing eighth in the second tier with 45 points, they would not reach such a peak again until 1996–97. It was their joint-second best ever finish after the 1930–31 season, along with the 1924–25, 1925–26, 1926–27, and 1996–97 campaigns.

A strong defence and two lengthy series of good results raised belief and expectation of promotion to the top-flight for the first time in the club's history. However two runs of poor results dashed such hopes, resulting in what would be a downward slide that would last until the end of World War II. After pushing for promotion, the club's directors were forced to initiate a cull of players at the season's end.

Overview

Second Division
The pre-season saw the arrival of ten new professionals, six of which were forwards. The most significant newcomers were Trevor Rhodes (Bradford Park Avenue), Jack Vickers (Charlton Athletic), as well as Ken Gunn and Billy Tabram (both from Swansea Town).

The season started excellently with ten wins in the opening fifteen matches. At the end of this run Sydney Dickinson was brought in from Bradford Park Avenue, though the Vale then went on to lose five of their next six matches, conceding sixteen goals and scoring just three. The slide was halted with a 1–0 Boxing day victory over Lincoln City in which top-scorer Tom Nolan became one of only two Vale players sent off in the period between 1918 and 1947. The result nevertheless kept the club within a point of the promotion places. This was supplemented by seven of a possible eight points in their next four games, including victories at The Dell and Valley Parade.

Their run ended on 5 February at The Old Recreation Ground with a 1–0 defeat to eventual champions Grimsby Town. From this point the promotion campaign completely collapsed, with a 4–0 loss soon coming to Welsh strugglers Swansea. New signing Jack Blackwell from Charlton couldn't reverse the trend despite helping the side to their biggest win of the season with a 5–1 thrashing of Millwall the following week. A fortnight later and a 2–0 win over promotion chasing Preston North End meant promotion was back on the cards for the "Valiants". The Sentinel'''s "Placer" commented that Vale had the easiest remaining fixtures of the chasing pack and thus had a "great chance of ascending to the First Division for the first time in their career".

Their remaining eleven games yielded a return of merely seven points, lacking a reserve side, fatigue had set into the first team. One significant defeat came at Old Trafford, which helped Manchester United avoid relegation to the third tier for what would have been the only time in their history. Young Fred Mitcheson did make a name for himself however, scoring a hat-trick in his debut in a 4–0 win over Plymouth Argyle.

They finished in eighth position, gaining 45 points from 42 games. Seven more points were required to match promoted Preston North End, though they finished twelve points clear of relegated Millwall. Billy Tabram had helped secure the Vale's defence, their 55 goals conceded the lowest in the division behind Preston. Attacking wise, their 60 goals were a poor return for a top-of-the-table club, with 33 of these coming from Tom Nolan (22) and Trevor Rhodes (11).

Finances
On the financial side, a loss of £2,771 was announced despite strict economic budgeting. Gate receipts had risen slowly to £11,868, though a rare transfer deficit was made, and expenses had risen sharply. The club announced that it would consider offers for any of its players, blaming the fans for a lack of enthusiasm, exemplified by an attendance of 2,990 (raising just £136) for the end-of-season clash with Nottingham Forest, despite having recently built a stand with cover for 15,000 spectators. The upshot of this was the release of a massive fifteen players, a list which included: Bill Cope, Sydney Dickinson, Len Armitage, and Jimmy McGrath. Billy Tabram was also sold to Hull City for a large fee, whilst Fred Mills' transfer to Leeds United and George Poyser's move to Brentford also brought in some much needed cash. In the boardroom, Adrian Capes announced his retirement. It was, according to historian Jeff Kent, "the end of an era".

Cup competitions
In the FA Cup, defeat came in the Third Round to Third Division South side Charlton Athletic at The Valley despite 'special training' measures beforehand.

For the first and only time the club also entered the Welsh Cup. Vale lost out to Bristol City at the semi-final stage.

League table

ResultsPort Vale's score comes first''

Football League Second Division

Results by matchday

Matches

FA Cup

Player statistics

Appearances

Top scorers

Transfers

Transfers in

Transfers out

References
Specific

General

Port Vale F.C. seasons
Port Vale